Li Lu (born April 6, 1966) 
is a Chinese-born American value investor, businessman and philanthropist. He is the founder and chairman of Himalaya Capital Management. Prior to emigrating to America, he was one of the student leaders of the 1989 Tiananmen Square student protests. In 2021, he also co-founded The Asian American Foundation and serves as its chairman.

Early life and education
Li Lu was born and grew up in Tangshan, China during the Cultural Revolution. He was a survivor of 1976 Tangshan earthquake, one of the deadliest in recorded history. In 1985, he went to Nanjing University, majored in Physics but later transferred to Economics. In 1989, he participated in the Tiananmen Square student protests and became one of the student leaders. He helped organize the students and participated in a hunger strike. After the crackdown on the movement, he fled the PRC and went to New York City at the age of 23 because his grandfather had received his PhD at Columbia University.

In 1990, he published a book about his experience in China titled Moving the Mountain: My Life in China. The book was the basis of a 1994 feature-film documentary, Moving the Mountain, produced by Trudie Styler and directed by Michael Apted, which probed the origins of the 1989 protests in Tiananmen Square and the consequences of the movement in the lives of several of the movement's student leaders. The book recounts a symbolic marriage ceremony on May 22, 1989, between Li Lu and his then girlfriend, Zhao Ming, at the Heroes' Monument. Students gathered at the wedding to congratulate the married couple and sang the "Wedding March," which gradually turned into "The Internationale." Chai Ling quotes Li Lu in her book as saying the marriage was meaningless .

At Columbia, Li first enrolled in the American Language Program to learn English. He then studied in the School of General Studies and later transferred to Columbia College. He ended up joining the college, law school and business school over a six-year period. Li Lu was one of the first in Columbia's history to receive three degrees simultaneously: a B.A. in economics, a M.B.A. and a J.D. in 1996.

Investment career
Li was inspired to get into investment after hearing Warren Buffett, a Columbia alumnus, give a lecture at Columbia in 1993. As detailed in the Foreword to the Chinese Edition of Poor Charlie’s Almanack: The Wit and Wisdom of Charles T. Munger, Li Lu found Buffett’s lecture on the principles of investing in the stock market “concise, logical and convincing.” Shortly thereafter, Li Lu began investing in stocks while a student at Columbia University.

In 1997, Li Lu founded Himalaya Capital Management, known for its disciplined and value-oriented approach to investing.  From 1998 to 2004, he managed both a hedge fund and a venture capital fund.

Charlie Munger, vice-chairman of Berkshire Hathaway and a long-time partner of the legendary investor Warren Buffett, is one of the investors of his fund, and a "mentor and good friend" (in Li Lu's own words). Li Lu met Charlie Munger on Thanksgiving 2003 and they have been friends since. With Munger's help, Li transformed his hedge fund into a long-only investment vehicle which is currently focused on global investment opportunities. Munger has stated that Li Lu is the only outside manager he has ever invested with and has described him as the “Chinese Warren Buffett.” Part of Li's agreement with Munger was that the fund would be closed to new investors. The fund remained closed to new investors from 2004 to 2013 and does not charge a management fee.

Himalaya now has almost US$18.5 billion in capital under management investing in global securities. As of June 2021, its largest U.S. investment is in Micron Technology with a value of US$1 billion.

Li Lu's investing mantra is "accurate and complete information," including understanding the character of a CEO by visiting his local church and speaking to his neighbors. He believes the most important thing in investing is intellectual honesty, recognizing that there is always a possibility that “you don’t know that you don’t know.” According to a 2021 interview by Columbia Business School Professor Bruce Greenwald, Li Lu’s investment strategy attempts to identify and invest in long-term compounders, focusing on the nature of a business’ competition “such that one could predict the outcome in 10 years, even with all the up and downs in the macro environment” which he says is the most important.

Li Lu has been known as the man who introduced the Chinese battery and electric car maker BYD Company to Charlie Munger and Warren Buffett. He is an informal advisor to BYD. His investment partnership owns about 2.5% of BYD.

Li was rumored to be the front runner to manage a large portion of Berkshire Hathaway's investment portfolio once Warren Buffett steps down. According to The Wall Street Journal, Charlie Munger once said "it is a foregone decision" that Li Lu would be going to be a member of Berkshire's top investors team after Warren Buffett retires. This was also hinted several times in some conversations with Buffett. In 2010, it was revealed that Li Lu had withdrawn himself from consideration for the job.

Philanthropy & other activities
In May 2021, Li Lu alongside several Asian-American business leaders, including Jerry Yang, co-founder of Yahoo, and Joseph Tsai, co-founder of Alibaba, launched The Asian American Foundation (TAAF) a nonprofit organization with $125 million in initial commitments from the board. TAAF's mission statement is to serve the 23 million Asian Americans and Pacific Islanders (AAPI) in three key areas: anti-hate programs, education, and data and research. Li Lu serves as co-founder and chairman of the board of The Asian American Foundation (TAAF). Since launch, TAAF has raised over $1 billion to support AAPI communities.

In January 2020, Li Lu co-founded the Guardians of the Angeles Charitable Foundation to combat the global COVID-19 crisis and now serves as Chairman of the Board of the Foundation.
 
In 2020, Li Lu wrote and published a book in China titled Civilization, Modernization, Value Investment and China.

In May 2010, Li Lu helped to translate and publish the Chinese version of Poor Charlie's Almanack, The Wit and Wisdom of Charles T. Munger in China and wrote a foreword for the book.

Li Lu currently serves as a trustee of Columbia University and California Institute of Technology (Caltech).

Recognition
Li Lu was elected to The American Academy of Arts and Sciences in 2020.

He is a past recipient of the John Jay Award from Columbia College, the Raoul Wallenberg Human Rights Award from the Congressional Human Rights Foundation, and the Reebok Human Rights Award. He is featured in the Smithsonian Institute's Family of Voices, a part of the ongoing twenty-year Exhibition, starting in 2017, "Many Voices, One Nation" at the National Museum of American History.

Published works 
 文明、现代化、价值投资与中国 (Civilization, Modernization, Value Investing and China, 2020)
 Foreword to the Chinese Edition of Poor Charlie’s Almanack: The Wit and Wisdom of Charles T. Munger (2010)
 Moving the Mountain: My Life in China

References

External links
 
 Moving the Mountain at the Internet Movie Database
 Himalaya Capital official website

1966 births
Living people
American finance and investment writers
American financiers
American hedge fund managers
American investment bankers
American money managers
American political writers
American male non-fiction writers
American venture capitalists
Berkshire Hathaway people
Chinese dissidents
Chinese emigrants to the United States
Chinese political writers
Columbia Business School alumni
Columbia Law School alumni
Members of Committee of 100
Nanjing University alumni
1989 Tiananmen Square protesters
People from Tangshan
Henry Crown Fellows